The sixth season of Parks and Recreation originally aired in the United States on the NBC television network, from September 26, 2013, with an hour long premiere, and concluded on April 24, 2014, with an hour-long finale. It premiered in its new Thursday 8:00 pm timeslot. This season consisted of 22 episodes. It stars Amy Poehler, Rashida Jones, Aziz Ansari, Nick Offerman, Aubrey Plaza, Chris Pratt, Adam Scott, Rob Lowe, Jim O'Heir and Retta. The show moved to Thursdays at 8:30 pm beginning with its 100th episode.

Much like the other seasons, Season 6 follows Leslie Knope (Amy Poehler) and her co-workers in local government of fictional Indiana town, Pawnee. The season chronicles Leslie facing the recall vote from City Council, Ann Perkins's (Rashida Jones) and Chris Traeger's (Rob Lowe) move to Michigan to start their family, Andy Dwyer's (Chris Pratt) career in London, and the city merger of Eagleton and Pawnee, resulting in the Unity Concert organized by Leslie.

Cast

Main
 Amy Poehler as Leslie Knope, the councilwoman for the town of Pawnee who loves her home town. She has not let politics dampen her optimism; her ultimate goal is to become President of the United States. Poehler departed from the NBC sketch comedy series Saturday Night Live, where she was a cast member for nearly seven years, to star in Parks and Recreation. It was only after she was cast that Daniels and Schur established the general concept of the show and the script for the pilot was written.
 Rashida Jones as Ann Perkins, a nurse and political outsider who gradually becomes more involved in Pawnee government through her friendship with Leslie. Jones was among the first to be cast by Daniels and Schur in 2008, when the series was still being considered as a spin-off to The Office, where Jones had played Jim Halpert's girlfriend Karen Filippelli.
 Aziz Ansari as Tom Haverford, Leslie's sarcastic and underachieving subordinate, who eventually begins to consider leaving his city hall job to pursue his own entrepreneurial interests. As with Jones, Daniels and Schur had intended to cast Ansari from the earliest stages of the development of Parks and Recreation.
 Nick Offerman as Ron Swanson, the deadpan parks and recreation director who, as a libertarian, believes in as small a government as possible. As such, Ron strives to make his department as ineffective as possible, and favors hiring employees who do not care about their jobs or are poor at them. Nevertheless, Ron consistently demonstrates that he secretly cares deeply about his co-workers.
 Aubrey Plaza as April Ludgate, a cynical and uninterested parks department intern who eventually becomes the perfect assistant for Ron. The role was written specifically for Plaza; after meeting her, casting director Allison Jones told Schur, "I just met the weirdest girl I've ever met in my life. You have to meet her and put her on your show."
 Chris Pratt as Andy Dwyer, a goofy and dim-witted but lovable slacker. Pratt was originally intended to be a guest star and the character Andy was initially meant to appear only in the first season, but the producers liked Pratt so much that, almost immediately after casting him, they decided to make him a regular cast member starting with season two.
 Adam Scott as Ben Wyatt, Leslie's husband, a competent but socially awkward government official trying to redeem his past as a failed mayor in his youth. Scott left his starring role on the Starz comedy series Party Down to join the show.
 Rob Lowe as Chris Traeger, an excessively positive and extremely health-conscious government official. Unlike Scott, Lowe was originally expected to depart after a string of guest appearances, but later signed a multi-year contract to become a regular cast member.
 Jim O'Heir as Jerry Gergich, a sweet-natured but painfully incompetent longtime city employee who is the main target of the office petty unkindness, yet enjoys his life as the husband of a gorgeous woman and the father of three beautiful daughters. He reached retirement with a full pension in season 5, but returned to the Parks office to work as an intern. As of season six, the other characters have taken to calling him "Larry Gengurch," after accidentally calling himself that name.
 Retta as Donna Meagle, the confident and competent office manager for the Pawnee Parks and Recreation Department. She is now accepting of her coworkers, previously dismissing them as boring. She has little tolerance for stupidity, can sometimes be selfish, enjoys casual dating, and is irresistible to many men. Donna loves her car, a Mercedes-Benz M-Class SUV.

Recurring
 John Balma as Barney Varmn, an accountant. He regularly attempts to hire Ben as an employee.
 Alison Becker as Shauna Malwae-Tweep, a newspaper journalist working for The Pawnee Journal.
 Kristen Bell as Ingrid de Forest, an elitist city councilwoman from Eagleton.
 Lucy Lawless as Diane Lewis, a middle school vice-principal and Ron's wife.
 Richard Burch as Herman Lerpiss, the owner of the Pawnee Pawn Shop.
 Andrew Burlinson as Wyatt "Burly" Burlison, the lead guitarist of Andy's band "Mouse Rat".
 Mo Collins as Joan Callamezzo, a tabloid journalist and hostess of the local news/talk show Pawnee Today.
 Billy Eichner as Craig Middlebrooks, the former office manager of Eagleton's parks department. After the Pawnee-Eagleton city merger, he is brought into the Pawnee parks department as the "associate administrator", and forms a friendship with Donna.
 Sydney Endicott as Madison, a young intern at the parks department.
 Mary Faber as Kathryn Pinewood, a representative for the Pawnee Restaurant Association.
 Andy Forrest as Kyle, a government employee who is constantly ridiculed by Andy.
 Jon Glaser as Councilman Jeremy Jamm, a member of the Pawnee city council and Leslie's nemesis.
 James Greene as Councilman Fielding Milton, the longest serving member of the Pawnee city council.
 Eric Isenhower as Orin, a creepy and disturbed friend of April.
 Jay Jackson as Perd Hapley, a popular Pawnee television journalist and the host of news programs Ya Heard? With Perd! and The Final Word with Perd!.
 Marc Evan Jackson as Trevor Nelsson, one of Pawnee's top attorneys in the employment of Dr. Saperstein.
 Yvans Jourdain as Councilman Douglass Howser, the head of the Pawnee city council.
 Richard Portnow as Mitch Savner, a local businessman and potential investor for Tom's restaurant.
 Ben Schwartz as Jean-Ralphio Saperstein, Tom's dimwitted and cocky best friend.
 Jenny Slate as Mona-Lisa Saperstein, Tom's crazy ex-girlfriend and Jean-Ralphio's sister.
 Helen Slayton-Hughes as Ethel Beavers, an elderly government employee.
 Brady Smith as Grant Larson, director of the Midwest branch of the National Park Service.
 Kevin Symons as Councilman Bill Dexhart, a member of the Pawnee city council who is frequently embroiled in outrageous sex scandals.
 Cooper Thornton as Dr. Harris, a sarcastic doctor at Pawnee's hospital.
 Jeff Tweedy as Scott Tanner, the former lead singer of a band called "Land Ho!".
 Susan Yeagley as Jessica Wicks, the vain and superficial widow of Nick Newport Sr., one of the richest men in Pawnee.
 Henry Winkler as Dr. Saperstein, a gynecologist and father of Jean-Ralphio and Mona-Lisa.

Guest stars
 Blake Anderson as Mike Bean, CEO of tech company "Gryzzl".
 Matt Besser as Crazy Ira, one of the hosts of the radio show Crazy Ira and The Douche.
 Dan Castellaneta as Derry Murbles, the host of the Pawnee radio show Thoughts for Your Thoughts.
 The Decemberists as themselves.
 Bo Burnham as Chip McCapp, a spoiled teenage country singer.
 Sam Elliott as Ron Dunn, the former head of the Eagleton parks department.
 Ginuwine as a fictional version of himself; he is Donna's cousin.
 Kathryn Hahn as Jennifer Barkley, a successful political campaign manager and old acquaintance of Ben and Leslie.
 Jon Hamm as Ed, an incompetent employee at the National Park Service.
 Kay Hanley as herself.
 Erinn Hayes as Annabel Porter, a well-respected Pawnee lifestyle guru.
 John Hodgman as August Clementine, an Eagleton radio host.
 Rob Huebel as Harvey Spielyorm, the unlikable owner of a tent store.
 Keegan-Michael Key as Joe, a school principal and Donna's ex-boyfriend.
 Heidi Klum as Ulee Danssen, the mayor of a town in Denmark.
 Nick Kroll as Howard "The Douche" Tuttleman, one of the hosts of the Pawnee radio show Crazy Ira and The Douche.
 Letters to Cleo as themselves.
 Andrew Luck as himself.
 Tatiana Maslany as Nadia Stasky, a doctor and love interest for Tom.
 Robert Mathis as himself.
 Megan Mullally as Tammy Swanson (aka Tammy Two), Ron's sex-crazed ex-wife.
 Michelle Obama as herself.
 June Diane Raphael as Tynnyfer, a former employee of the Eagleton parks department.
 Peter Serafinowicz as His Royal Excellence Lord Edgar Darby Covington, 14th Earl of Cornwall-Upon-Thames and 29th Baron of Hertfordshire, who also goes by the name "Eddie", the head of a British charitable organization.
 Yo La Tengo as Bobby Knight Ranger, a fictional Night Ranger tribute band.
 Adam Vinatieri as himself.

Production
On July 31, 2013, it was reported by BuzzFeed that Rob Lowe and Rashida Jones would be leaving the series around the middle of the season. Their final episode was episode 13, "Ann and Chris". Due to the departure of Jones and Lowe, longtime regulars Jim O'Heir and Retta were added to the show's opening credit sequence starting with episode 14, "Anniversaries". Jones appears as a special guest star in episode 17 when Ann has her baby.

Chris Pratt was absent for much of the early part of the season, due to him filming Guardians of the Galaxy in London. Executive producer Michael Schur stated the show went to London for the first two episodes in order for Pratt's character Andy to make an appearance. Pratt made a brief return in the sixth episode, with Schur adding that Pratt would return to the series in the tenth episode, the series' 100th episode.

In February 2014, NBC announced a digital tie-in for the show, titled "The Hapley Group", which aired on February 20. Created "to help viewers remain engaged with their favorite programs" while NBC broadcasts the 2014 Winter Olympics, it featured Jay Jackson, Matt Besser, Nick Kroll and Mo Collins reprising their roles as Perd Hapley, Crazy Ira, The Douche, and Joan Callamezzo, respectively, with Seth Morris as Mike Patterson, a new character who recurred on the TV show as well. The tie-in, directed by Morgan Sackett and written by Greg Levine, features the characters in a heated, political round-table discussion of Pawnee's hot topics. 

Retta tweeted on February 27, 2014, that filming for the season had finished.

Episodes

 denotes an extended episode.
 denotes an hour-long episode.

References

External links
Official Parks and Recreation site at NBC.com

6
2013 American television seasons
2014 American television seasons